Thai Airways Company or Thai Airways (TAC) was the domestic flag carrier of Thailand. Its main base was the domestic terminal (Terminal 3) at Don Mueang International Airport (then known as Bangkok International Airport). Its head office was located in Pom Prap Sattru Phai, Bangkok. In 1988 Thai Airways merged to become Thai Airways International.

History

Siamese Airways Company Limited was the domestic flag carrier of Thailand on March 1, 1947, according to a cabinet resolution. The first squadron had Douglas DC-3, Beechcraft C-45, L-5 Sentinel, Rearwin, Fairchild. The first flight was Bangkok-Phitsanulok-Lampang-Chiang Mai and began a Chiang Mai-Mae Sariang-Mae Hong Son two days later. The first international flight, a Bangkok-Songkhla-Penang service, was in December 1947.

The Government of Thailand issued a resolution on November 1, 1951, merging Siamese Airways with Pacific Overseas Airline (Siam) Limited (POAS), forming Thai Airways Company Limited (TAC) ( (บดท)). It was also known as Thai Airways.

Thai Airways established the international flag carrier in 1960, Thai Airways International Company Limited (THAI), as a joint venture between Scandinavian Airlines System (SAS) with the Scandinavian carrier initially providing a 30% share capital of two million Baht.

Thai Airways bought the turboprop Avro 748 in 1963, the jet Boeing 737-200 in 1977, Short 330 in 1982, Short 360 and Airbus A310-200 in 1985.

On April 1, 1988, Thai Airways Company Limited (TAC) merged with Thai Airways International, under the cabinet resolution, single national airline of the Kingdom of Thailand, as authorized by General Prem Tinsulanonda, Prime Minister at the time.

Thai Airways's 11 aircraft, consisted of 3 Boeing 737-200, 4 Short 330, 2 Short 360 and 2 Airbus A310-200, combined fleet with Thai Airways International, total up 41 aircraft. Airline codes changed to Thai Airways International's airline codes at the end of 1988.

Thai Airways International operates the Larn Luang Office, the former Thai Airways Company head office, in Pom Prap Sattru Phai.

Destinations

Domestic Destinations of Thailand:

from/to Bangkok – Don Mueang International Airport
Chiang Mai – Chiang Mai International Airport
Chiang Rai – Chiang Rai International Airport
Hat Yai – Hat Yai International Airport (formerly destination as Songkhla)
Khon Kaen – Khon Kaen Airport
Lampang – Lampang Airport
Phitsanulok / Uttaradit – Phitsanulok Airport
Phuket – Phuket International Airport
Nakhon Sawan – Nakhon Sawan Airport
Nakhon Si Thammarat – Nakhon Si Thammarat Airport
Sakon Nakhon – Sakon Nakhon Airport
Surat Thani – Surat Thani International Airport
Surin – Surin Airport
Trang – Trang Airport
Ubon Ratchathani – Ubon Ratchathani Airport
Udon Thani – Udon Thani International Airport

from/to Chiang Mai – Chiang Mai International Airport
Chiang Rai – Chiang Rai International Airport
Mae Hong Son – Mae Hong Son Airport
Mae Sariang – Mae Sariang Airport
Mae Sot – Mae Sot Airport
Nan – Nan Nakhon Airport

from/to Hat Yai – Hat Yai International Airport (formerly destination as Songkhla)
Phuket – Phuket International Airport
Pattani – Pattani Airport
Narathiwat – Narathiwat Airport

International Destinations:
Wattay International Airport, Vientiane, Laos
Penang International Airport, Penang, Malaysia
Kuala Lumpur International Airport, Kuala Lumpur, Malaysia
Noi Bai International Airport, Hanoi, Vietnam

Fleet

2 Airbus A310-200
3 Avro 748
2 Beechcraft C-45
4 Beechcraft Bonanza 35
1 Bell 206
5 Boeing 737-200
1 Consolidated Canso A
1 Consolidated PBY-5A Catalina
10 Douglas DC-3
3 Douglas DC-4
1 Fairchild 24W40
9 Hawker Siddeley HS 748
3 Lockheed L-1049G Super Constellation
5 Noorduyn UC-64A Norseman
2 Rearwin
1 Piper PA-23
4 Short 330
2 Short 360
6 Stinson L-5 Sentinel

Incidents and accidents
25 December 1967 Thai Airways Flight 002, a Douglas C-47A (HS-TDH), crashed at Chiang Mai International Airport due to pilot error, killing 4 out of 31 passengers and crew on board.
21 January 1968 A Thai Airways Sud Caravelle IA (HS-TGL) collided with a Thai Defense Beechcraft Baron that was photographing the Caravelle in flight; the Baron lost control and crashed, killing all six on board, but the Caravelle landed safely at Bangkok.
27 April 1980 Thai Airways Flight 231, a Hawker Siddeley HS 748 en route from Khon Kaen to Bangkok, lost altitude during a thunderstorm and crashed about 8 miles from Don Mueang International Airport. All four crew members and 40 of the 49 passengers were killed.
21 June 1980 A Thai Airways Hawker Siddeley HS 748 (HS-THG) overran the runway on takeoff at Chiang Rai Airport after failing to get airborne; all 21 on board survived, but the aircraft was written off.
15 April 1985 A Thai Airways Boeing 737-200 (HS-TBB) hit high ground on Phuket and was destroyed by the impact and subsequent fire. All four passengers and seven crew members were killed. The accident occurred after a failure of both engines was reported.
28 April 1987 A Thai Airways Hawker Siddeley HS 748 (HS-THI) made a wheels-up landing at Chiang Rai Airport after the co-pilot forgot to lower the landing gear; all 43 passengers and crew on board survived, but the aircraft was written off.
31 August 1987 Thai Airways Flight 365, a Boeing 737-200 (HS-TBC) flying from Hat Yai to Phuket, crashed into the sea off Phuket. All nine crew members and 74 passengers were killed.

See also

Thai Airways International
Thai Smile
Nok Air
Don Mueang International Airport

References

External links
Official site of Thai Airways International
Company profile of Thai Airways Company and Thai Airways International
Thai Aviation History
Airline Codes

 
Defunct airlines of Thailand
Airlines established in 1947
Airlines disestablished in 1988
Thai Airways International
Thai companies established in 1947